Marcio Augusto Aguiar dos Santos, better known as Márcio or Testão (born 20 December 1981) is a Brazilian footballer who plays as a goalkeeper. Currently plays for Portuguesa da Ilha.

Career
Marcio began his career at São Paulo in 1999. São Paulo became the team until 2003. In 2004, he was loaned to Sâo Paulo. To excel in this club, he was hired, also on loan at Gremio. Despite being relegated to Serie B, continued at the club until the following summer, when it was released. In 2006, it agreed with Paysandu.

The following year he played in Ituano.

And since 2008 the Guild is Prudente (by March 2010, the club was called Barueri).

He moved from Grêmio Prudente to Brazilian Série A side Atlético Paranaense on 14 May 2011.

Career statistics
(Correct )

Honours
São Paulo
Campeonato Paulista: 2000
Torneio Rio-São Paulo: 2001
Supercampeonato Paulista: 2002

Paysandu
Campeonato Paraense: 2006

Grêmio Prudente
Campeonato Paulista do Interior: 2008

Brazil U-20
South American Youth Championship: 2001

Contract
 Grêmio Prudente.
Atlético Paranaense.

References

External links
 ogol
 soccerway

1981 births
Living people
Brazilian footballers
Brazilian expatriate footballers
Brazil under-20 international footballers
Campeonato Brasileiro Série A players
Liga Portugal 2 players
Association football goalkeepers
Footballers from São Paulo
São Paulo FC players
Paulista Futebol Clube players
Grêmio Foot-Ball Porto Alegrense players
Paysandu Sport Club players
Ituano FC players
Grêmio Barueri Futebol players
Club Athletico Paranaense players
Botafogo Futebol Clube (SP) players
Esporte Clube XV de Novembro (Piracicaba) players
S.C. Beira-Mar players
Expatriate footballers in Portugal
Uberlândia Esporte Clube players
Red Bull Brasil players
Associação Atlética Portuguesa (RJ) players